Danek Mozdzenski  (born 1952) is a Canadian sculptor.

Works

Lois Hole, Alberta's late lieutenant-governor in the Lois Hole library, Edmonton, Alberta;
Ezio Faraone, late Edmonton Police Service officer near the north end of the High Level Bridge;
Memorial to firefighters near the Old Strathcona Farmers' Market;
Crucifix in St. Joseph's Basilica, Edmonton;
Madonna in St. Theresa Church, Mill Woods;
bust of Francis Winspear at the Francis Winspear Centre for Music;

Collections 
Air Canada, Calgary, AB
Camrose Lutheran College, Camrose, AB
Centennial Library, Edmonton, Alberta
Citadel Theatre, Edmonton, AB
City of Edmonton, Edmonton, AB
City of Red Deer, Red Deer, AB
Edmonton Firefighters Memorial Society, Edmonton, AB
Edmonton Separate School Board, Edmonton, AB
Francis G. Winspear Centre for Music, Edmonton, AB
Government of Alberta, Edmonton, AB
Government of Canada, Ottawa, ON
Queen Elizabeth Planetarium, Edmonton, AB
Royal Tyrrell Museum of Palaeontology
St. Joseph's Basilica, Edmonton, AB
Syncrude Canada Ltd., Fort McMurray, AB

References

External links
 Legacy Magazine: Danek Mozdzenski
  Collector Gallery: Danek Mozdzenski
 Biography (in Polish) by the Canadian Polish Historical Society of Edmonton

1952 births
Artists from Edmonton
Canadian sculptors
Living people
Members of the Royal Canadian Academy of Arts